Jamal Kola (also Romanized as Jamāl Kolā and Jamāl Kalā) is a village in Kiakola Rural District, in the Central District of Simorgh County, Mazandaran Province, Iran. At the 2006 census, its population was 184, in 53 families.

References 

Populated places in Simorgh County